This is a list of Chilean Academy Award winners and nominees. This list details Chilean films and Chilean people who have either been nominated for or won an Academy Award.

Best Animated Short 
This list focuses on animated short films directed by Chilean-born filmmakers.

This list focuses on Chilean films that won or were nominated for the Animated Short award.

Best Cinematography 
This list focuses on Chilean-born cinematographers.

Best Documentary Feature 
This list focuses on Chilean films that won or were nominated for the Documentary Feature award.

Best International Feature Film 

This list focuses on Chilean-born directors that won or were nominated for the Best International Feature Film award for a film submitted by a different country.

This list focuses on Chilean films that won or were nominated for the Best International Feature Film award.

Best Original Score 
This list focuses on scores by Chilean-born composers.

See also 

 List of Chilean submissions for the Academy Award for Best Foreign Language Film
 Cinema of Chile
 List of Chilean films

References 

Chile
Academy Award winners